Hyperthaema ruberrima is a moth of the subfamily Arctiinae. It was described by William Schaus in 1905. It is found in French Guiana.

References

 

Phaegopterina
Moths described in 1905